Bhedaghat  is a town and a nagar panchayat in Jabalpur district  in the state of Madhya Pradesh, India. It is situated by the side of river Narmada and is approximately 20 km from Jabalpur city. Bhedaghat is famous for the high marble rocks making a valley through which river Narmada flows. The place also has a beautiful waterfall, known as Dhuandhar Falls (literally meaning a stream of smoke, because of its appearance).

Demographics
 India census, Bhedaghat had a population of 1840. Males constitute 53% of the population and females 47%. Bhedaghat has an average literacy rate of 63%, higher than the national average of 59.5%; with male literacy of 71% and female literacy of 53%. 16% of the population is under 7 years of age.

Transport
The nearest railway station is Bhedaghat Railway station.  It is possible to take a tempo (auto-rickshaw) from Jabalpur to Bhedaghat. Its distance from the main city is about 28 km. The nearest airport is Jabalpur.

Portrayals in popular culture
 1961: The hit song "O Basanti Pawan Paagal" from the film Jis Desh Mein Ganga Behti Hai starring Raj Kapoor and Padmini was shot at Bhedaghat.
 1973: The Hindi film Bobby uses Bhedaghat as the setting of its climactic scene.
 1974: The Hindi film Pran Jaye Par Vachan Na Jaye starring Sunil Dutt, Rekha, Premnath, Jeevan, Bindu, Madan Puri, and Ranjeet used Bhedaghat as the location of its climax.
 2001: The song "Raat Ka Nasha Abhi" from the Hindi film Asoka was shot in Bhedaghat among the marble rocks by the Narmada River.
 2013: The opening episode of the STAR Plus TV series Mahabharata features Bhedaghat as a location where Shantanu and Satyavati meets.
 2016: The crocodile fight scenes of the Hindi film Mohenjo Daro are shot at Bhedaghat.
 2018: The scenes of Karan going to meet Tilewali Maa from the Gujarati film Reva are shot at Bhedaghat.

Politics
In 2011 assembly elections, congress registered a win here.

References

External links 

Cities and towns in Jabalpur district
Tourist attractions in Jabalpur district